Amanda Louise Freed (born December 26, 1979) is an American, former professional softball utility player and pitcher. She played college softball for UCLA, winning the national title for the Bruins in the 1999 Women's College World Series. In two other national runner-up finishes, she was also named All-Tournament in all her appearances at the world series. She later won a gold medal with Team USA at the 2004 Summer Olympics. In 2005, Freed joined the National Pro Fastpitch and played until 2008 for the defunct Rockford Thunder. She also served as a coach for Virginia.

Early life and college career
Born in Fountain Valley, California and raised in nearby Cypress, Freed went to Pacifica High School in Garden Grove.  As a pitcher in high school, Amanda won numerous awards, including the Gatorade National Female Athlete of the Year and Gatorade Softball Player of the Year.  As a senior in high school, Freed was rank the top pitcher in the world and even threw five perfect games.

As the top softball recruit in 1998, Freed decided to attend UCLA where she played for the UCLA Bruins softball team from 1999 to 2002.  To this day (2018) Freed stats at UCLA are impressive.  Freed holds records in the top 10 for eight categories of pitching and eight categories of hitting.

International playing career
Amanda was also an alternate at the 2000 Olympics, where the team won gold. Making the team in 2004, Freed made four appearances contributing a double and scoring three runs.

Professional playing career
From 2005 to 2008, Freed played for National Pro Fastpitch, first with the Texas (later Rockford) Thunder from 2005 to 2007 then with the Chicago Bandits Cowles Cup championship team in 2008.

Post-playing career
In 2008, Freed was an assistant coach at Virginia under Eileen Schmidt.

In 2009, Freed was a personal trainer for Reese Witherspoon during filming for the movie How Do You Know, in which Witherspoon played a softball player.

Freed later became a softball color commentator for FSW, ESPN and Pac-12 Network.

College Statistics

References

External links
 
 2006 World Cup profile
 2004 Olympic profile
 
 
 

1979 births
Living people
Olympic gold medalists for the United States in softball
Olympic softball players of the United States
Softball players at the 2004 Summer Olympics
Softball players from California
Sportspeople from Orange County, California
UCLA Bruins softball players
People from Fountain Valley, California
People from Cypress, California
Medalists at the 2004 Summer Olympics